CPR Buffalo Yard was a Canadian Pacific Railway facility in Buffalo, New York, United States. It was officially known as "SK yard". The yard was formerly part of the Delaware & Hudson Railroad. In 2004 it closed and was replaced by a joint CPR-Norfolk Southern Railway facility on the east side of Binghamton, New York.

The CPR facility was used by freight trains.

Transportation in Buffalo, New York
History of Buffalo, New York
2004 disestablishments in New York (state)
Canadian Pacific Railway infrastructure
Transportation buildings and structures in Erie County, New York